is a Japanese manga series written and illustrated by Muchimaro. It was serialized in Kodansha's manga app and website Magazine Pocket from June 2020 to October 2021, with its chapters collected in three tankōbon volumes.

Publication
Written and illustrated by Muchimaro, It's Just Not My Night started in Kodansha's manga app and website Magazine Pocket on June 24, 2020, while its first chapter was also published in Weekly Shōnen Magazine. The series finished on October 27, 2021. Kodansha collected its chapters in three tankōbon volumes, released from December 9, 2020, to January 7, 2022.

In North America, the manga has been licensed for English released by Seven Seas Entertainment, who will publish it under their Ghost Ship mature imprint starting on April 5, 2022.

Volume list

References

External links
 

Comedy anime and manga
Kodansha manga
Seven Seas Entertainment titles
Shōnen manga
Supernatural anime and manga
Vampires in anime and manga